The 2009 Lahore bombing, at police headquarters in Lahore, Pakistan on 27 May 2009, killed at least 35 people and injured 250. During the attack gunmen fired on guards then destroyed the emergency response building at the city's police headquarters. Offices used by the Inter-Services Intelligence (ISI) agency nearby also suffered damage.

Pakistani accounts from the time of the attack say the three attackers who died in the attack were unidentified.
Two of the attackers emerged from the Toyota van used in the attack, and fired on security officials.  The driver was not able to breach the boundary of security pylons, before he detonated the bomb.
Some eyewitnesses claimed additional terrorists provided covering fire.

Attribution
Authorities immediately blamed Taliban for this attack. Taliban later took the responsibility for the attack, calling it a retaliatory step for Pakistan's military operations against Taliban in the Swat valley. The caller Hakimullah Mehsud, deputy to Baitullah Mehsud, threatened of more attacks on government facilities in Lahore, Rawalpindi, Islamabad and Multan, asking people to leave those cities. Another group, Tekreek-e-Taliban Punjab, also claimed credit for the attack.

In the fall a jihadist named Ali Jaleel, from the Maldive Islands was identified as one of the bombers.

References 

21st-century mass murder in Pakistan
Mass murder in 2009
Spree shootings in Pakistan
Terrorist incidents in Pakistan in 2009
Car and truck bombings in Pakistan
Terrorist incidents in Lahore
May 2009 events in Pakistan
2000s in Lahore
Attacks on buildings and structures in Pakistan
Attacks on police stations in the 2000s
Building bombings in Pakistan